Charlie or Charley Evans may refer to:

Charley Evans, American baseball player
Charlie Evans (Australian footballer) (born 1942), Australian footballer
Charlie Evans (American football) (born 1948), American football player
Charlotte Jordan (a.k.a. "Charlie Evans", born 1995), English actress

See also 
Charles Evans (disambiguation)